Charles Lindsey may refer to:

Charles H. Lindsey, British computer scientist
Charles Lindsey (editor) (1820–1909), English-born Canadian journalist and editor

See also
Charles Lindsay (disambiguation)